Kairasikkaran is a 1984 Indian Tamil-language film directed by SSK Shankar for SKS Films. The film stars Prabhu and Radha. It was released on 1 June 1984.

Plot

Cast 
Prabhu as Vijay
Radha as Reaka 
Silk Smitha as asha
Manorama as Pairmala
Senthamarai as Janarathan 
Vinu Chakravarthy as Kaataa Muthu 
Vennira Aadai Moorthy as Doctor Kamachi
Sivachandran as Soori

Soundtrack 
Soundtrack was composed by Ilaiyaraaja. The song "Adichikko Site Adichikko" was adapted from Ilaiyaraaja's song Santhoshakke from the 1981 Kannada film Geetha. The song "Nilavondru" attained popularity.

References

External links 
 

1980s Tamil-language films
1984 films
Films scored by Ilaiyaraaja